Quarterflash is the debut album of American rock band Quarterflash. It was released in 1981 on Geffen Records and features the single, "Harden My Heart", which reached No. 3 on the Billboard Hot 100. It also hit No. 1 on the Billboard Album Rock Tracks chart. The follow-up single was "Find Another Fool", which reached No. 16 on the Hot 100. The album was certified platinum in the United States by the RIAA.

"Harden My Heart" is featured in the 2006 video game Grand Theft Auto: Vice City Stories on fictional power ballad radio station, Emotion 98.3. It is also a featured song in the Broadway musical Rock of Ages.

Track listing
All songs written by Marv Ross except as noted.
 "Harden My Heart" – 3:51
 "Find Another Fool" – 4:32
 "Critical Times" (Jack Charles) – 5:06
 "Valerie" – 4:20
 "Try to Make It True" – 3:38
 "Right Kind of Love" – 3:49
 "Cruisin' With the Deuce" – 4:10
 "Love Should Be So Kind" – 3:10
 "Williams Avenue" – 7:57

Personnel
Rindy Ross – Vocals, saxophone
Marv Ross – Guitars
Jack Charles – Guitars, vocals
Rick DiGiallonardo – Keyboards
Rich Gooch – Bass
Brian David Willis – Drums, percussion

Additional personnel
Paulinho da Costa – Percussion
Bruce Sweetman – Violin
John Boylan – Additional vocals
Timothy B. Schmit – Additional vocals
Mike Porcaro – Bass on "Williams Avenue"

Production
John Boylan – Producer
Paul Grupp – Engineer
Phil Jamtaas – Assistant Engineer
Erik Zobler – Assistant Engineer

Charts

Weekly charts

Year-end charts

Singles

References

Quarterflash albums
1981 debut albums
Albums produced by John Boylan (record producer)
Geffen Records albums
Albums recorded at Record Plant (Los Angeles)